Helmuth Heinrich Liesegang (18 July 1858, Duisburg - 31 July 1945, Leipzig) was a German landscape painter; associated with the Düsseldorfer Malerschule.

Life and work 
He was the son of a gymnasium teacher, Helmuth Karl Albert Liesegang, and his wife, Agnes née Jüngel. As a teenager, he loved to roam through the surrounding woods, sketching. After completing his secondary education, he enrolled at the Kunstakademie Düsseldorf, where he studied from 1877 to 1885. His primary instructor there was Eugen Dücker. He also learned etching from Carl Ernst Forberg. 

In 1885, together with his friend, Arthur Kampf, he visited Paris, where he came under the influence of the Barbizon school; especially Jean-François Millet and Jules Bastien-Lepage. Later, he became interested in the Hague school; travelling throughout Belgium and Holland, sketching landscapes. In 1888, he became an honorary member of the artists' association, Malkasten (Paintbox). The Club sought to combine the stylistic approaches of the Barbizon and Hague schools with the aesthetics of Impressionism.

Two years later, the Lucas Club was subordinated to the new . In 1899, a new "St. Lucas Club" was founded by Liesegang and the other founders of the original Club, with the addition of August Deusser, Otto Heichert and Gustav Wendling.

In his later years, he was awarded the title of Professor, and continued to take part in large exhibitions; notably those of "Young Rhineland". In 1929, he published a memoir: Aus meinen Lehr- und Wanderjahren (From my Apprenticeship and Travelling Years).

When Düsseldorf was heavily damaged by bombing raids, he was evacuated to Leipzig, where he died at the age of eighty-seven. A street nearby is named after him.

References

Further reading 
 "Liesegang, Hellmuth". In Friedrich von Boetticher: Malerwerke des 19. Jahrhunderts. Beitrag zur Kunstgeschichte. Vol. 1/2, Bogen 31–61: Heideck–Mayer, Boetticher’s Verlag, Dresden 1895, pg.872 (Online)
 
 Fred Kocks: Helmuth Liesegang. Ein Düsseldorfer Meister der Gegenwart, Graf und Schumacher, Düsseldorf, 1943
 Herbert Griebitzsch: "Der Maler Professor Helmut Liesegang", In Die Kunst für Alle, #59, Vol.3, 1944, pp. 49–53 (Online).

External links 

 Helmuth Liesegang und die Düsseldorfer Kunst, Biography @ the Rambow and Liesegang families website
 More works by Liesegang @ ArtNet

1858 births
1945 deaths
19th-century German painters
19th-century German male artists
German landscape painters
Kunstakademie Düsseldorf alumni
People from Duisburg
20th-century German painters
20th-century German male artists